Vice-Admiral Sir Isaac William Trant Beloe  (9 December 1909 – 3 April 1966) was a Royal Navy officer who became Deputy Supreme Allied Commander Atlantic.

Naval career
Beloe joined the Royal Navy in 1923. He served in World War II commanding the destroyer HMS Campbeltown and frigate HMS Cotton in the Western Approaches, Western Mediterranean and Russian convoys. After the War he commanded the destroyer HMS Contest and then became Deputy Director of the Royal Navy Staff College before commanding the destroyer HMS Dainty and then the aircraft carrier HMS Ocean. He was appointed Commodore commanding the Pakistan Flotilla in 1957, Commodore in charge of the Royal Navy Barracks, Devonport in 1959 and Flag Officer, Medway and Admiral Superintendent, Chatham in 1961. His last appointment was as Deputy Supreme Allied Commander Atlantic in 1964 before his sudden death from a heart attack as he left his home in 1966.

References

1909 births
1966 deaths
Knights Commander of the Order of the British Empire
Companions of the Order of the Bath
Royal Navy vice admirals
Royal Navy officers of World War II
Recipients of the Distinguished Service Cross (United Kingdom)